The current yield, interest yield,  income yield, flat yield, market yield, mark to market yield or running yield is a financial term used in reference to bonds and other fixed-interest securities such as gilts. It is the ratio of the annual interest (coupon) payment and the bond's price:

 

According to Investopedia, the clean market price of the bond should be the denominator in this calculation.

Example 
The current yield of a bond with a face value (F) of $100 and a coupon rate (r) of 5.00% that is selling at $95.00 (clean; not including accrued interest) (P) is calculated as follows.

Shortcomings of current yield 
The current yield refers only to the yield of the bond at the current moment. It does not reflect the total return over the life of the bond, or the factors affecting total return, such as:
 the length of time over which the bond produces cash flows for the investor (the maturity date of the bond), 
 interest earned on reinvested coupon payments, or reinvestment risk (the uncertainty about the rate at which future cash flows can be reinvested), and 
 fluctuations in the market price of a bond prior to maturity.

Relationship between yield to maturity and coupon rate 
The concept of current yield is closely related to other bond concepts, including yield to maturity (YTM), and coupon yield. When a coupon-bearing bond sells at;

 a discount:  YTM > current yield > coupon yield
 a premium:  coupon yield > current yield > YTM
 par:  YTM = current yield = coupon yield.

For zero-coupon bonds selling at a discount, the coupon yield and current yield are zero, and the YTM is positive.

See also
 Adjusted current yield

References

Current Yield at investopedia.com

Mathematical finance
Bond valuation
Fixed income analysis